The 2020–21 Northeast Conference men's basketball season began with practices in October 2020, followed by the start of the 2020–21 NCAA Division I men's basketball season in November. Conference play started in January and ended in March 2021.

The NEC tournament was held in March with the higher-seeded team hosting each game.

Changes from last season
Robert Morris left the conference and joined the Horizon League.

Head coaches 

Notes: 
 All records, appearances, titles, etc. are from time with current school only. 
 Year at school includes 2020–21 season.
 Overall and NEC/NCAA records are from time at current school and are before the beginning of the 2020–21 season. Because the current LIU athletic program inherited the athletic history of LIU Brooklyn, Kellogg's record includes his two seasons at LIU Brooklyn before the LIU athletic merger.
 Previous jobs are head coaching jobs unless otherwise noted.

Preseason

Preseason coaches poll
Sources: 

() first place votes

Preseason All-NEC team
Sources:

NEC regular season

Player of the week
Throughout the regular season, the Northeast Conference offices named player(s) of the week and rookie(s) of the week.

Against other conferences

Regular Season

Postseason

Conference matrix
This table summarizes the head-to-head results between teams in conference play.

All-NEC honors and awards
At the conclusion of the regular season, the conference selects outstanding performers based on a poll of league coaches, below are the results.

Postseason

NEC tournament
Due to complications caused by the COVID-19 pandemic, only the top four teams in the Northeast Conference were eligible to compete in the 2021 NEC tournament. Teams were seeded by record within the conference, with a tiebreaker system to seed teams with identical conference records.

NCAA tournament

See also
2020–21 Northeast Conference women's basketball season

References

External links
NEC website